Tum Se Kehna Tha is a 2020 Pakistani television romantic drama series co-produced by Momina Duraid under banner MD Productions. It features Kinza Hashmi, Azfar Rehman and Areej Mohyudin in leading roles with Raeed Muhammad Alam, Laila Zuberi, Nadia Afgan and Munazzah Arif in supporting cast. It first aired on Hum TV on 24 November 2020.

Plot summary 
The series follows the struggles and adversities of two sisters Yusra and Rabi, and misunderstandings that create between them due to a series of unfortunate events.

Cast 
 Kinza Hashmi as Yusra
 Azfar Rehman as Faris
 Areej Mohyudin as Rabi
 Raeed Muhammad Alam as Yasir
 Munazzah Arif as Zeenat; Yusra and Rabi's mother
 Khalid Butt as Yusra and Rabi's father
 Laila Zuberi as Yasir's mother
 Mariam Mirza as Samina; Faris's mother
 Nadia Afgan as Saba Chaudhary
 Subhan Awan as Saim

References 

2020 Pakistani television series debuts
Pakistani romantic drama television series